Central University of Science and Technology (CUST) is an industry-driven university of Bangladesh.

History
The government of Bangladesh approved the establishment, in the capital, Dhaka, of Central University of Science and Technology (CUST) on 24 February 2016 under the Private University Act 2010. CUST considers this its founding day.

Academics

Schools and programmes 
There are six programmes (proposed) under three schools :
School of Business and Industrial Development (SBID)
 Bachelor of Business Administration
 Master of Business Administration
School of Computer Science and Information Technology (SCSI)
 Bachelor of Computer Science and Engineering
School of Engineering and Civilization Planning (SECP)
 Bachelor of Electrical and Electronic Engineering
 Bachelor of Civil Engineering
 Bachelor of Mechanical Engineering

See also
 List of universities in Bangladesh

References

External links
 Official Website
 UGC's Website

Private universities in Bangladesh
Universities and colleges in Dhaka